Lysapsus caraya is a species of frog in the family Hylidae found in central and southern Brazil. Its common name is Mato Verde harlequin frog.

Lysapsus caraya is an aquatic frog of open flooded savanna. It also occurs on floating meadows of large rivers. It breeds in the associated waterways. Where it occurs it is common, and no threats are known.

References

Lysapsus
Amphibians of Brazil
Endemic fauna of Brazil
Amphibians described in 1964
Taxonomy articles created by Polbot